Delft is the main railway station of the city of Delft, South Holland, Netherlands. It is located on the oldest railway line in the country, between the stations of The Hague Central and Rotterdam Central. Along with a new 2.3 km rail tunnel under the city centre, the current station opened on 28 February 2015. The new building, which integrates the station hall with the city's municipal offices, was designed by Mecanoo, an international architecture firm that originated in Delft. The project also included a rebuilt bus station, tram stops and improved bicycle parking.

1885 building

The initial Delft railway station was located on the Houttuinen, close to the current building. The first train passed through it on 31 May 1847, and three days later the station opened to the public. Because of increasing numbers of passengers and goods transported, a new, larger railway station opened in 1885, just to the south of the original station. Christiaan Posthumus Meyjes, Sr. designed the latter building. This building was used until 2015 when the current building opened. The old station building is historically significant, and since 2018 has been occupied by an Italian restaurant.

Railway zone project

From 1964, the railway through Delft ran on a double track viaduct, created to eliminate level crossings, intending to improve the safety and fluidity of traffic through the city. However, the rail viaduct became unpopular for being visually unattractive, and because the line through Delft is busy—with between 300 and 350 trains passing daily—causing major noise pollution. Therefore, a large urban design project was formulated in 1999, designed by Spanish urban planner Joan Busquets, which saw the rail viaduct replaced by two tunnels.

The first phase was completed in February 2015, and brought the first tunnel tube with two rail tracks in operation. In 2015 the decommissioned viaduct was torn down, and a second tunnel tube with two more rail tracks was constructed underneath the path previously occupied by it. Redevelopment of the freed-up space above ground proceeded.

Currently the tube with the third en fourth tracks are complete and the above-ground railway lines are being altered to accompany the extra rails.

Gallery

References

External links

NS website 
Dutch Public Transport journey planner 

Railway stations in South Holland
Railway stations opened in 1847
Railway stations on the Oude Lijn
Railway stations located underground in the Netherlands
Buildings and structures in Delft
1847 establishments in the Netherlands
Railway stations in the Netherlands opened in 1847